Hiq or Hiaq or Hiyqa may refer to:
 Hiq, Ardabil (حيق - Ḩīq)
 Hiq, Heris (هيق - Hīq), East Azerbaijan Province
 Hiaq, Khvajeh (هيق - Hīaq), Heris County, East Azerbaijan Province

See also 
 Hi-Q (disambiguation)